Parliamentary elections were held in Madagascar on 16 June 1993, the first following the approval of a new constitution in a referendum that reintroduced full multi-party democracy the previous year. 

The Committee of Active Forces won the most seats, whilst parties aligned with President Albert Zafy won 75 seats in total. Voter turnout was 54.68%.

Results

References

Elections in Madagascar
1993 in Madagascar
Madagascar
June 1993 events in Africa
Election and referendum articles with incomplete results